This is a list of horror films that were released in 2016.

References

2016
2016-related lists